Another Woman in Love is Maureen McGovern's fifth studio album and her first one in eight years. It was recorded at Counterpoint Recording Studios in New York City in 1985 and was released two years later. It was the first album to categorize McGovern into the musical styles of jazz and pop standards and is one of two of her albums to contain only solo piano accompaniment. Of all the thirteen tracks on the album, only three of them are original (McGovern's longtime friend and collaborator Judy Barron wrote the lyrics to these three). The rest are simply covers of older songs by various American composers, though the album's first (and only) single was Peter Allen's "I Could Have Been a Sailor." The second track is a two-song medley of songs co-written by Jerome Kern.

The picture for the front of the album was photographed by Nancy LeVine in Le Madeleine, New York City. It shows that McGovern has kept her hair dyed brown but had curled it and let it grow down to her shoulders.

The first page inside the album cover contains liner notes from Mel Tormé and just one quote by McGovern ("This is the album I've always wanted to make.").

Track listing

Album credits
Piano: Mike Renzi
Arrangements by: Mike Renzi
Cover design: Christopher Austopchuk
Cover photo: Nancy LeVine
Liner notes: Mel Tormé
Management: Barron Management

Counterpoint Studios:
Engineers: Hugo Dwyer and Michael Golub
Assistant engineers: Tom Brick and Steve Brauner
Mixed by Ron Barron and Michael Golub

CBS Studios:
Remixed by Ron Barron
Engineer: Bud Graham
Consultant: Gary Schultz

Charts
Album - Billboard (North America)

External links
Maureen McGovern - Another Woman in Love

1987 albums
Maureen McGovern albums
Columbia Records albums